Gamma Cancri, or γ Cancri, is a star in the northern constellation of Cancer. It is formally named Asellus Borealis , the traditional name of the system. Based on parallax measurements, it is located at a distance of approximately 181 light years from the Sun. The star is drifting further away with a radial velocity of 29 km/s. In 1910 this star was reported to be a spectroscopic binary by O. J. Lee, but is now considered a single star. Since it is near the ecliptic, it can be occulted by the Moon and, very rarely, by planets.

Nomenclature
γ Cancri (Latinised to Gamma Cancri) is the star's Bayer designation. It bore the traditional name Asellus Borealis (Latin for "northern donkey"). In 2016, the International Astronomical Union organized a Working Group on Star Names (WGSN) to catalogue and standardize proper names for stars. The WGSN decided to attribute proper names to individual stars rather than entire multiple systems. It approved the name Asellus Borealis for the star on 6 November 2016 and it is now so included in the List of IAU-approved Star Names. Together with Delta Cancri, it formed the Aselli, flanking Praesepe.

In Chinese astronomy, Ghost refers to an asterism consisting of Theta Cancri, Eta Cancri, Gamma Cancri and Delta Cancri. Gamma Cancri itself is known as the third star of Ghost.

Properties
Gamma Cancri presents as a white A-type subgiant with an apparent magnitude of +4.67. The star is an estimated 171 million years old and is spinning with a projected rotational velocity of 86 km/s. It has 2.18 times the mass of the Sun and shines with a luminosity approximately 36 times greater at an effective temperature of 9108 K.

It has been included as a member of the Hyades Stream based on its distance, space motion, and likely age.

References

A-type subgiants
Hyades Stream

Cancer (constellation)
Cancri, Gamma
Durchmusterung objects
Cancri, 43
074198
042806
3449
Asellus Borealis